Jaime Vásquez (22 August 1929 – 23 February 2015) was a Chilean footballer.  He competed in the men's tournament at the 1952 Summer Olympics.

References

External links
 

1929 births
2015 deaths
Chilean footballers
Chile international footballers
Olympic footballers of Chile
Footballers at the 1952 Summer Olympics
Place of birth missing
Association football midfielders